Francis Kenneth McNeil was a professional American football player for the Brooklyn Dodgers. He attended Washington & Jefferson College.

See also
 1932 Brooklyn Dodgers (NFL) season

Notes
 

1909 births
1971 deaths
Brooklyn Dodgers (NFL) players
Sportspeople from Brooklyn
Players of American football from New York City
Washington & Jefferson College alumni
Washington & Jefferson Presidents football players